Hulk Classics was an action figure line based on the characters of Marvel Comics, and produced by Toy Biz in 2003.  The line revolves around the Hulk and his supporting cast from the comic book series.

Series

One 
Abomination
Joe Fixit Hulk
Smart Hulk
Super Poseable Savage Hulk

Two 
Absorbing Man
Gamma Punch Hulk (with Bruce Banner)
Mecha Hulk (with Gremlin; never appeared in comics)
War Hulk from Hulk's time as Apocalypse's Horseman (the figure's body would later be reused for the Planet Hulk and King Hulk Marvel Legends figures from Hasbro)

See also
Marvel Legends

External links
MarvelousNews.com Daily Marvel Legends News, Complete Photo Database and Collector Community

Marvel Comics action figure lines
Hulk (comics) in other media